Guayabito is a corregimiento in San Carlos District, Panamá Oeste Province, Panama with a population of 502 as of 2010. Its population as of 1990 was 443; its population as of 2000 was 481.

References

Corregimientos of Panamá Oeste Province